Pervo-Ertil is a rural locality (a settlement) and the administrative center of Pervoertilskoye Rural Settlement, Ertilsky District, Voronezh Oblast, Russia. The population was 356 as of 2010. There are 3 streets.

Geography 
Pervo-Ertil is located 11 km south of Ertil (the district's administrative centre) by road. Dmitriyevka is the nearest rural locality.

References 

Rural localities in Ertilsky District